The Law Reform Committee was a committee in England and Wales appointed by the Lord Chancellor "to consider, having regard especially to judicial decisions, what changes are desirable in such legal doctrines as the Lord Chancellor may from time to time refer to Committee".

The Lord Chancellor's decision to create this committee was announced on 2 May 1952 by the Attorney General, Lionel Heald, at the dinner of the West Surrey Law Society. The Solicitors Journal said that the proposed step was "overdue". The Committee was appointed on 16 June 1952. In 2006, John Wheeler said that the Committee was "defunct".

Composition
Six members of the Committee were judges, two were Queen's Counsel, two were solicitors and the remaining three were professors of law.

Reports

See also
Law commission
Law Commissions Act 1965

References

Soources
 Blair, Michael C. "The Law Reform Committee: The First Thirty Years" (1982) 1 Civil Justice Quarterly 64 
 Andrew S Burrows. Clerk & Lindsell on Torts. Sixteenth Edition. Sweet & Maxwell. London. 1989. 
 Sir Robert Megarry and Sir William Wade and Charles Harpum and Stuart Bridge and Martin Dixon. The Law of Real Property. Seventh Edition. Sweet & Maxwell. London. 2008.

Citations

Law reform in the United Kingdom
Law commissions
1952 establishments in the United Kingdom